Dara Baloch is a 1983 Pakistani, Action film and a musical film directed by Masud Butt and produced by Abbas Asghar. Film starring actor Sultan Rahi, Iqbal Hassan, Mustafa Qureshi, and Ilyas Kashmiri.

Cast

Track list
The music of film Dara Baloch (1983) is by famous musician Wajahat Attre. The lyrics are penned by Hazin Qadri, and the singers are :
 Noor Jehan
 Naheed Akhtar

References

External links
 Dara Baloch (1983), Retrieved 27 December 2015
 Dara Baloch Photos yt, Retrieved 27 December 2015
 

1980s crime action films
Pakistani crime action films
1983 films
Punjabi-language Pakistani films
1980s Punjabi-language films